Trinity Anglican Church may refer to:

 Trinity Anglican Church (Connersville, Indiana)
 Trinity Anglican Church (Cambridge, Ontario)
 Trinity Anglican Church (Ottawa)